Take the L may refer to:
 "Take the L" (The Motels song), 1982
"Take The L Out of Liver", a parody song by "Weird Al" Yankovic
"Take the L", a 2006 song by Tanya Morgan
"Take the L", an emote in Fortnite which uses the Loser gesture

See also
Chicago "L", the rapid transit system serving Chicago, U.S. 
L (New York City Subway service), U.S. 
"Take The L Train (To B'klyn)" and "Take The L Train (To 8th Ave.)", 1995 songs by Brooklyn Funk Essentials